Merville, real name Pierre-François Camus (1781 in Pontoise – 1853 in Belleville (Seine)) was a 19th-century French Algerian settler who initially worked as a physician, then an actor and finally a playwright.

Biographie 
Pierre-François Camus took the surname of his mother, Villemer, which he transformed into Merville as pen name. It is under this pen name that he began in theater. We owe him some thirty-five theatre plays which he signed alone or in collaboration and which were given on the most important Parisian stages (Opéra-Comique, Ambigu-Comique, Second Théâtre-Français, Théâtre de Madame, Favart, Odéon, Porte-Saint-Martin, etc.). All of them had very honorable success. Among these, it is worth mentioning La Famille Glinet, ou les premiers temps de la ligue which was, at that time, the talk of the town because it was suspected that King Louis XVIII had closely worked on it. This play was a five-act comedy presented for the first time at the Théâtre Favart by the comedians of the Odéon, 18 July 1818.

Merville also wrote three novels: Le Vagabond, histoire contemporaine in 4 volumes (this novel is an exaggeration of the miseries of the people), Le Baron de l'Empire in 5 volumes (this novel tells the story of Charette and some peculiarities of the wars in the Vendée and Jacquot's fate), and Saphorine, ou l'aventurière du Faubourg Saint-Antoine in 2 volumes.

The first published work by Merville is dated 1814. It was Lequel des deux ? ou la Lettre équivoque, comédie en 1 acte, en prose which was the first play to be presented, in Paris, in 1814, on the stage of the Théâtre de l'Odéon.

The latest edition of a work by Merville is dated 1881. It is En revenant de Pontoise. Les Oubliettes de P.-F. Camus dit Merville, réédition annotée. Recherches sur l'origine du dicton, opinions de divers auteurs, recueillies, commentées et publiées par Henri Le Charpentier.

Pierre-François Camus-Merville lived in Villiers-sur-Tholon (Yonne) where he was city councilor from 1846 to 1848. He was a chevalier of the Légion d'honneur.

Works 

 Les Comptes de tutelle, comédie-vaudeville in 1 act (with Bayard)
 La Première Affaire, three-act comedy, in prose, Paris, Odéon, 28 August 1827
 Le Savetier de Toulouse, drama in 4 acts (with Francis Cornu], music by M. Adrien), Paris, Ambigu-Comique, 20 October 1832
 Sophie ou le Mauvais ménage, drama in 3 acts (with Francis, music by M. Adrien), Paris, Ambigu-Comique, 2 August 1832
 Le Septuagénaire, ou les Deux Naissances, drama in 4 acts (with Gustave Albitte, music by M. Louis Alexandre Piccinni), Paris, Gaîté, 12 August 1834
 Suite du répertoire du Théâtre de Madame. La Maîtresse (with H. Leroux et Alexis)
 Le Vagabond, histoire contemporaine
 Les Quatre Âges, comedy in verse in 5 acts
 Le Vagabond, histoire contemporaine
 Le Procureur impérial
 Le Félon, historical drama in 3 acts (with *** [Mlle Maucs], music by M. Amédée), Paris, 2 February 1830
 La Grande Duchesse, lyrical drama in 3 acts (with Mélesville, music by M. Carafa, Paris, Opéra-Comique, 16 November 1835
 L'Homme poli, ou la Fausse bienveillance, comedy in 5 acts and in verse, Paris, Second Théâtre-Français, 8 April 1820
 La Maîtresse, comédie-vaudeville in 2 acts (with The Leroux et Alexis), Paris, Théâtre de Madame, 6 May 1829
 Paul Briolat
 Le Jeune Prince, ou la Constitution de ***, comedy in 3 acts, in prose, Paris, Odéon, 7 July 1831
 Lequel des deux ? ou la Lettre équivoque, comedy in 1 act, in prose, Paris, Odéon, 6 September 1814
 En revenant de Pontoise. Les Oubliettes de P.-F. Camus dit Merville, réédition annotée. Recherches sur l'origine du dicton, opinions de divers auteurs, recueillies, commentées et publiées par Henri Le Charpentier
 La Première Affaire, comedy in 3 acts
 Favras, épisode de 1789, in 3 acts (with T. Sauvage), Lyon, Gaîté, 19 May 1831
 À 21 ans, ou l'Agonie de Schönbrünn, one-act drama (with Francis [Cornu]), Paris, Ambigu-Comique, 19 August 1832
 Almanach des spectacles, Paris, 1822
 La Boiteuse
 Le Baron de l'Empire
 Les Comptes de tutelle, comédie-vaudeville in 1 act (with Bayard), Paris, Théâtre de Madame, 15 June 1826
 Les Cent-et-une nouvelles nouvelles des Cent-et-un, adorned with a hundred-and-one vignettes
 Contes et nouvelles
 Le Contrariant, comedy in prose, in 1 act, Paris, Odéon, 28 December 1828
 Les Deux Apprentis
 L'Écrivain public, drama in 3 acts, in prose (with Drouineau), Paris, Porte-Saint-Martin, 10 May 1828
 Tom-Rick, ou le Babouin, play in three acts imitated from English (with Francis Cornu and Alexandre [Armand d'Artois]), Paris, Porte-Saint-Martin, 16 October 1832
 Jean-Bart à Versailles, historical fact in 1 act, mingled with couplets (with Maréchalle), Paris, Gaîté, 1 March 1817
 La Famille Glinet, ou les premiers temps de la ligue, five-act comedy 
 Louis XIII, ou la , historical drama in 5 acts (with P. Tournemine), J. A. Lelong
 Le Juif errant, drame fantastique in 5 acts and 1 epilogue, with new choirs (with Mallian, music by M. Paris)
 Les Deux Anglais, comedy in 3 acts and in prose, Paris, Odéon, 3 July 1817
 Saphorine, ou l'Aventurière du faubourg Saint-Antoine, 2 vol., Paris, Barba 1820.

References 

19th-century French dramatists and playwrights
Chevaliers of the Légion d'honneur
1780s births
People from Pontoise
1853 deaths
French people in French Algeria